Flora Park Cave Spurdle (1883–1973) was a notable New Zealand journalist, museum worker and local historian. She was born in Whanganui, New Zealand on March 3, 1883. She died there on October 7th, 1973.

References

1883 births
1973 deaths
New Zealand women historians
New Zealand curators
People from Whanganui
New Zealand women curators
20th-century New Zealand historians
20th-century New Zealand journalists